Lucas Marcos Meireles (born 22 September 1995), commonly known as , is a Brazilian footballer who plays as a forward and currently plays for Japanese club Fagiano Okayama.

Club career
On 5 July 2018, he joined Albanian-based Kosovan side Gjilani. However, later in the same month, he moved to Greece to join Apollon Larissa.

He moved to Kagoshima United the following season. After one season with Kagoshima United, he was loaned to Zweigen Kanazawa. This loan spell was very successful, with Lucão scoring numerous goals for Zweigen Kanazawa, finishing with ten league goals for the season.

At the expiration of his loan deal with Zweigen Kanazawa, it was announced that he would join Matsumoto Yamaga for the 2021 season. He signed a contract extension with Matsumoto Yamaga for the 2022 season. He left at the end of the 2022 season.

In February 2023, he signed for Fagiano Okayama, following his departure from Matsumoto Yamaga.

Career statistics

Club

Notes

References

External links

1995 births
Living people
Brazilian footballers
Brazilian expatriate footballers
Association football forwards
Macedonian First Football League players
Football League (Greece) players
J2 League players
J3 League players
FK Makedonija Gjorče Petrov players
FK Renova players
SC Gjilani players
Apollon Larissa F.C. players
Kagoshima United FC players
Matsumoto Yamaga FC players
Fagiano Okayama players
Brazilian expatriate sportspeople in North Macedonia
Brazilian expatriate sportspeople in Greece
Brazilian expatriate sportspeople in Japan
Expatriate footballers in North Macedonia
Expatriate footballers in Kosovo
Expatriate footballers in Greece
Expatriate footballers in Japan